Christian Bruder (born 30 April 1982) is a retired German ski jumper.

In the World Cup he finished once among the top 15, his best result being a fourteenth place from Sapporo in February 2005.

He also participated in Nordic combined, but not in World Cup events in this particular sport.

External links
 
 

1982 births
Living people
German male ski jumpers
German male Nordic combined skiers